Sebastien Roberts is a French-Canadian actor of television and film, working in both French and English projects since 2000.

Early life, education, and career
He was born Sébastien Robert in Montreal.  Robert's family moved from Montreal to Sarnia in Southwestern Ontario when he was young.  He performed in several plays while in high school, and later joined an improv team in Ontario.

Robert originally worked as a pipe fitter at an oil refinery.  He moved back to Montreal when his son was born.  Sebastien had his son Jesse at age 21.  He decided to pursue becoming an actor after his twin sister died at the age of 26.  Robert went to a theatre school in 2000.  Robert graduated from the Neighborhood Playhouse in New York shortly afterward, in 2002.  He has used the stage name, Sebastien Roberts, since at least 2005.  Roberts is fluent in French and English.

Acting work
Film appearances include the TV series Northern Rescue on CBC Television and Netflix and Mary Kills People on Hulu.  Roberts also works in French productions, his latest being four seasons of the TV show O; as well as a new character introduced in season five of the hit French series, Unité 9.  His role as a rapist, Anthony Burk, in the English/German film One Way (2006) with Til Schweiger, Eric Roberts and Michael Clarke Duncan caught people's attention due to the graphic rape scenes.  He made appearances in the films Lucky Number Slevin (2006) and Black Swarm (2007); the TV-mini-series documentary, Canada Russia '72 (2006) as Rod Gilbert; and the made for TV mystery, Ice Blues (2008).

Filmography

References

External links
 

1972 births
Living people
Canadian male television actors
Male actors from Montreal